Mihail Mikhailovich Chemiakin (or Shemyakin, born 4 May 1943) is a Russian painter, stage designer, sculptor and publisher, and a controversial representative of the nonconformist art tradition of St. Petersburg.

Early life
Chemiakin was born to a military family. His father, a Kabardian from the Caucasus Mountains Mikhail Petrovich Kardanov, had lost his parents and was adopted by a friend of his father's, White Army officer Piotr Chemiakin. The artist's father eventually became a Soviet Army officer. He received one of the first Orders of the Red Banner at the age of thirteen. Chemiakin's mother was an actress and poet Yulia Nikolaevna Predtechenskaya of Russian noble heritage. She met her future husband in 1941 with the start of the Great Patriotic War and asked him to take her to the front line. She served in cavalry under the command of Lev Dovator and took part in battles alongside her husband.

Mihail Chemiakin spent his early years in East Germany where his father served. His family returned to the Soviet Union in 1957. He studied at the secondary school of art affiliated with the Il’ya Repin Institute of Painting, Sculpture and Architecture in Leningrad, but was expelled from it in 1961 for «aesthetic deprivation» of classmates and failing to conform to Socialist Realism norms. Between 1959 and 1971 he worked various niche jobs, in-between which he participated in different art projects.

Career
He later got a job at the Hermitage Museum. With his colleagues from the museum Chemiakin organized an exhibition in 1964, after which the director of the museum was fired and all the participants forced to resign. In 1967 he founded the group of artists called St. Petersburg. Together with the philosopher Vladimir Ivanov he created a treatise called Metaphysical Synthesism dedicated to «new forms of icon painting based on studying of religious art of all epochs and nations». He was subjected to forced psychiatric treatment and in 1971 he was exiled from the Soviet Union. According to Chemiakin, the KGB officer behind this actually saved him by offering to «quietly leave the country» with $50 in the pocket, because some people from the Artists' Union of the USSR insisted on his isolation.

He settled in France where he published Apollon-77, an almanac of post-Stalinist art, poetry, and photography. He moved to New York in 1981. Since the early 1990s he started visiting Russia once again, working on street shows by Slava Polunin, ballets by the Mariinsky Theatre, a TV series by Russia-K and other government-backed projects. In 2007 he returned to France where he currently resides.

Chemiakin works in a broad range of media and subjects, as can be seen in the 2010 two-volume book on his art, Mihail Chemiakin (Azbooka publishers, St. Petersburg).

He has illustrated books for Mikhail Yupp.

In 2001, commissioned by the City of Moscow, Chemiakin created a monument "Children Are the Victims of Adult Vices", a group of sculptures in a park 2000 feet south of the Kremlin, behind the British Ambassador's residence. Other sculptures by Chemiakin include Peter the Great in St. Petersburg's Peter and Paul Fortress, Peter the Great in London, Monument to Victims of Terrorism in Vladikavkaz (North Ossetia), Vladimir Vysotsky in Samara, Russia.

Since roughly 2001, he has worked as an artistic designer on the Russian animated feature film Hoffmaniada. In 2001 he directed and designed an entirely new production of The Nutcracker for the Mariinsky Theater, where he also created a second ballet based on the same tale by Hoffman, "The Magic Nut".  In 2010 the artist created a new production of "Coppelia" for the Lithuanian National Opera and Ballet Theater.

See also
 List of Russian artists

References

Sources
The Grove Dictionary of Art, by Jane Shoaf Turner (Ed.), Grove's Dictionaries. 
Kolodzei Art Foundation
Kolodzei Art Foundation and Kolodzei Collection of Russian and Eastern European Art

Further reading

Mihail Chemiakin; Vol. 1: Russian Period, Paris Period; Vol. 2: Transformations, New York Period, 1986 by Mihail Chemiakin, Mosaic Press, NY, 1986.. 
M. Chemiakin: A View of the Artist Through the Media, 1962–1999, by Ilya Bass and Alan Lamb, Woollyfish Imprints, 2000. 
Staging the Nutcracker, by Mihail Chemiakin, Rizzoli, 2001. 
 Heike Welzel: „Michail Šemjakin: Malerei und Graphik. Von der inoffiziellen sowjetischen Kunst zur russischen Kunst im Exil". Gebr. Mann Verlag, Berlin 2006. 

1943 births
Living people
Soviet painters
Painters from Saint Petersburg
Soviet sculptors
Circassian people of Russia
Soviet prisoners and detainees
Soviet emigrants to the United States
State Prize of the Russian Federation laureates